The following is a partial list of highways in Argentina, including present and past National and Provincial Routes:

Present routes 

 Autopista Ingeniero Pascual Palazzo (Autopista Ruta Panamericana)
 Justiniano Posse Freeway, Autopista Justiano Posse
 East Access Freeway, Autopista Acceso Oeste
 National Route A001, Avenida General Paz
 National Route A002 
 National Route A003 
 National Route A004 
 National Route A005 
 National Route A006 
 National Route A007
 National Route A009 
 National Route A010
 National Route A011
 National Route A012
 National Route A014
 National Route A015
 National Route A016 
 National Route A019 
 National Route A023 
 National Route A024 
 National Route A025 
 National Route A026
 National Route 1
 National Route 3 
 National Route 5 
 National Route 7 
 National Route 8
 National Route 9
 National Route 11 
 National Route 12 
 National Route 14 
 National Route 16 
 National Route 18 
 National Route 19 
 National Route 20 
 National Route 22 
 National Route 23 
 National Route 25 
 National Route 26 
 National Route 33 
 National Route 34 
 National Route 35 
 National Route 36 
 National Route 38 
 National Route 40 
 National Route 50 
 National Route 51 
 National Route 52 
 National Route 60 
 National Route 64 
 National Route 65 
 National Route 66 
 National Route 68 
 National Route 74 
 National Route 75 
 National Route 76 
 National Route 77 
 National Route 78 
 National Route 79 
 National Route 81 
 National Route 86 
 National Route 89 
 National Route 95 
 National Route 98 
 National Route 101
 National Route 105
 National Route 117
 National Route 118
 National Route 119
 National Route 120
 National Route 121 
 National Route 122 
 National Route 123 
 National Route 127 
 National Route 130 
 National Route 131 
 National Route 135 
 National Route 136 
 National Route 141 
 National Route 142 
 National Route 143 
 National Route 144 
 National Route 145 
 National Route 146 
 National Route 147 
 National Route 148 
 National Route 149 
 National Route 150 
 National Route 151 
 National Route 152 
 National Route 153 
 National Route 154 
 National Route 157 
 National Route 158
 National Route 168 
 National Route 173 
 National Route 174 
 National Route 175 
 National Route 177 
 National Route 178 
 National Route 188 
 National Route 193 
 National Route 205 
 National Route 226 
 National Route 228 
 National Route 229 
 National Route 231 
 National Route 232 
 National Route 234 
 National Route 237 
 National Route 242 
 National Route 249 
 National Route 250 
 National Route 251 
 National Route 252 
 National Route 259 
 National Route 260 
 National Route 281 
 National Route 288 
 National Route 293  
 North Access Freeway

Old route designations 
 Expressway 2
 National Route 2 
 National Route 24 
 National Route 53 
 National Route 55 
 National Route 56 
 National Route 57 
 National Route 59 
 National Route 62 
 National Route 63 
 National Route 67 
 National Route 90 
 National Route 92 
 National Route 93 
 National Route 94 
 National Route 103 
 National Route 114 
 National Route 126 
 National Route 128 
 National Route 129 
 National Route 156 
 National Route 166 
 National Route 172 
 National Route 191 
 National Route 192 
 National Route 195 
 National Route 197 
 National Route 200 
 National Route 201 
 National Route 202 
 National Route 227 
 National Route 240 
 National Route 241 
 National Route 243 
 National Route 248 
 National Route 253 
 National Route 254 
 National Route 256 
 National Route 258 
 National Route 270 
 National Route 272 
 National Route 273 
 Provincial Route 70 (Santa Fe)
 Provincial Route 80 (Santa Fe)
 Provincial Route 210 (Buenos Aires)

References

Highways
Argentina
Highways